The men's 60 kilograms event at the 2006 Asian Games was held on December 8, 2006 at the Al-Dana Banquet Hall in Doha, Qatar.

Schedule
All times are Arabia Standard Time (UTC+03:00)

Results

Prejudging round 

 Abdul Basir Latifi of Afghanistan originally got the 12th place, but was disqualified.

Final round

References

Results – Prejudging Round
Results – Final Round

Bodybuilding at the 2006 Asian Games